Ronald Roy 'Ron' Taylor (20 July 1932 – 4 February 2015) was an Australian rules footballer who played with South Melbourne and St Kilda in the Victorian Football League (VFL).

Taylor made his debut as a 20-year-old in 1953 but didn't have a full season until 1955, when he managed 15 games. In 1955 he kicked three goals in a game against Essendon at Windy Hill.

He was more successful as an amateur boxer, winning the Australian heavyweight title in 1959. This effort saw him represent Australia at the 1960 Rome Olympics, in the heavyweight division. Taylor was eliminated after being KO'd in the Preliminaries by American Percy Price.

1960 Olympic results
Below is the record of Ron Taylor, an Australian heavyweight boxer who competed at the 1960 Rome Olympics:

 Round of 32: bye
 Round of 16: lost to Percy Price (United States) by second-round knockout

References

1932 births
Sydney Swans players
St Kilda Football Club players
Olympic boxers of Australia
Boxers at the 1960 Summer Olympics
2015 deaths
Australian rules footballers from Victoria (Australia)
Australian male boxers
Heavyweight boxers